Pain Derazlat (also Romanized as Pā’īn Derāzlāt; also known as Derāz Lāt) is a village in Rahimabad Rural District, Rahimabad District, Rudsar County, Gilan Province, Iran. At the 2006 census, its population was 53, in 8 families.

References 

Populated places in Rudsar County